Robert Panitzki (born 29 April 1948) is an Australian former cricketer. He played four first-class matches for Tasmania between 1973 and 1976.

See also
 List of Tasmanian representative cricketers

References

External links
 

1948 births
Living people
Australian cricketers
Tasmania cricketers
Cricketers from Hobart